The men's Greco-Roman 77 kilograms wrestling competition at the 2018 Asian Games in Jakarta was held on 22 August 2018 at the Jakarta Convention Center Assembly Hall.

Schedule
All times are Western Indonesia Time (UTC+07:00)

Results
Legend
C — Won by 3 cautions given to the opponent
F — Won by fall
WO — Won by walkover

Main bracket

Repechage

Final standing

References

External links

Official website
UWW official website

Wrestling at the 2018 Asian Games